Alma Edwviges Alcaraz Hernández (born 17 October 1971) is a Mexican politician from the National Regeneration Movement. From 2006 to 2009, she served as Deputy of the LX Legislature of the Mexican Congress representing Sinaloa, at the time as a member of the National Action Party.

On September 27, 2018, Alcaraz was named the state director of MORENA in Guanajuato.

References

1972 births
Living people
Politicians from Sinaloa
Women members of the Chamber of Deputies (Mexico)
National Action Party (Mexico) politicians
21st-century Mexican politicians
21st-century Mexican women politicians
Morena (political party) politicians
Autonomous University of Sinaloa alumni
Members of the Congress of Sinaloa
20th-century Mexican politicians
20th-century Mexican women politicians
Members of the Chamber of Deputies (Mexico) for Sinaloa